Ryan Simpson (born 9 July 1985) is a Belizean former footballer who played as a midfielder.

Career
Simpson played club football for Print Belize, New Site Erei, Atlético Chiriquí, Georgetown Ibayani and Benguche United.

He has also represented Belize at international level.

References

1985 births
Living people
Belizean footballers
Belize international footballers
New Site Erei players
Atlético Chiriquí players
Georgetown Ibayani FC players
Association football midfielders
Belizean expatriate footballers
Belizean expatriate sportspeople in Panama
Expatriate footballers in Panama